Die merkwürdige Lebensgeschichte des Friedrich Freiherrn von der Trenck (English: The Peculiar Life Story of Friedrich, Baron von der Trenck) is a German television series based on the life of Friedrich von der Trenck, a Prussian officer, adventurer, and author. It ran for six episodes in 1973, and stars Matthias Habich as von der Trenck, alongside Rolf Becker (as Frederick the Great), Alf Marholm, and Nicoletta Machiavelli.

External links
 

Cultural depictions of Frederick the Great
Television series set in the 18th century
1973 German television series debuts
1973 German television series endings
Television series based on actual events
1970s German television miniseries
German-language television shows
ZDF original programming
Films directed by Fritz Umgelter